South Washington Street Parabolic Bridge is a historic Lenticular truss bridge located at Binghamton in Broome County, New York. It was constructed in 1886 and spans the Susquehanna River.  It is composed of three identical through trusses with an overall length of 484 feet.  The bridge was closed to vehicular traffic in 1969.  It is the longest multiple span, Lenticular truss bridge constructed in New York State during the 19th century.  It was constructed by the Berlin Iron Bridge Company of East Berlin, Connecticut. 
It was listed on the National Register of Historic Places in 1978. The bridge was rehabilitated between 2014 and 2017.

Photos

See also
Ouaquaga Lenticular Truss Bridge, a similar bridge also in Broome County

References

External links
South Washington Street Parabolic Bridge (Bridgehunter.com)
South Washington Street Bridge (Bridges and Tunnels)
Preservation Association of the Southern Tier properties of interest in Broome and Tioga Counties (New York State Landmarks; January 16, 2018)

History of Broome County, New York
National Register of Historic Places in Broome County, New York
Road bridges on the National Register of Historic Places in New York (state)
Bridges completed in 1886
Transportation buildings and structures in Broome County, New York
Lenticular truss bridges in the United States